Baby I Love You is an album by Andy Kim released by Steed Records.

The single title song hit #9 on the Billboard Hot 100, #1 in Canada, and #32 on the U.S. adult contemporary chart in 1969.  The single "So Good Together" hit #36 on the Billboard Hot 100 and #37 in West Germany. The album landed on the Billboard 200 chart, reaching #82.

Track listing 
 "Baby, I Love You" (Phil Spector, Jeff Barry, Ellie Greenwich)
 "Walkin' My La De Da" (Andy Kim, Jeff Barry)	
 "If I Were a Carpenter" (Tim Hardin)
 "Let's Get Married" (Andy Kim, Jeff Barry)
 "By the Time I Get to Phoenix" (Jimmy Webb)
 "I'll Be Loving You" (Andy Kim, Jeff Barry)
 "So Good Together" (Andy Kim, Jeff Barry)
 "I Got to Know" (Andy Kim, Jeff Barry)
 "This Is the Girl" (Giovanni Di Benedetto, Steve Tudanger)
 "Didn't Have to Tell Her" (Andy Kim, Jeff Barry)
 "This Guy's in Love with You" (Burt Bacharach, Hal David)

Chart positions
Album

Singles

References

1969 albums
Albums produced by Jeff Barry
Steed Records albums